John and John is a Ghanaian movie that features two friends who were both called John. One John duped a man by selling him fake gold. The two friends were running away with the money, but their car went faulty they lodged in a guest house. As they were taking the money from their bag, it fell on the ground and created anxiety among the guests and workers in the hotel whereby everybody wanted to steal the money

Of interest, the film is a wholesale, unauthorized remake of a South African film called Skeem which was written and directed by Tim Greene in 2011. In 2017, Ghanain journalists reached out to Greene to check Asamoah's claim that he had received permission to adapt the movie, which he had not.  Asamoah agreed to purchase the remake rights, but never followed through.  No legal action was taken, as the cost of pursuing an intellectual property case against Asamoah would not be cost effective.

Cast
Kwadwo Nkansah (Liwin)
Richard Asante (Kalybos)
Pete Edochie
Nana Ama Mcbrown
Joselyn Dumas
KSM
Patricia Opoku-Agyemang (Ahuofe Patri)
Bishop Bernard Nyarko
Selly Galley
Salma Mumin
John Dumelo
Abeiku Santana 
Gracey Nortey
Grace Omaboe
Moesha Buduong
Fella Makafui
Roselyn Ngissah
James Gardiner
Umar Krupp

References

Ghanaian drama films
2010s English-language films
English-language Ghanaian films